Mian Kheran (also Romanized as Mīān Kharān, Meyān Kherān, and Miyān Kherān) is a village in Yusefvand Rural District, in the Central District of Selseleh County, Lorestan Province, Iran. At the 2006 census, its population was 185, in 40 families.

References 

Towns and villages in Selseleh County